Blastobasis dicionis is a moth in the  family Blastobasidae. It is found in Costa Rica. Its forewings are 5–7 mm long and are brownish-grey intermixed with brownish-grey scales tipped with pale brownish-grey and pale brownish-grey scales. The hindwings are translucent pale brown, gradually darkening towards the apex.

Etymology
The specific name is derived from Latin dicio (meaning, authority, power or control).

References

Moths described in 2013
Blastobasis